The Sweden national under-19 football team is the football team representing Sweden in competitions for under-19 year old players. Primarily, it competes to qualify for the annual UEFA European Under-19 Championship.

Competitive record
 Champions   Runners-up   Third place   Fourth place   Tournament held on home soil

Under-18 era

FIFA Youth Tournament Under-18

UEFA Youth Tournament Under-18

UEFA European U-18 Championship

Under-19 era

UEFA European U-19 Championship

Players

Current squad
 The following players were called up for the 2023 UEFA European Under-19 Championship qualification matches.
 Match dates: 17, 20 and 23 November 2022
 Caps and goals correct as of:''' 27 September 2022, after the match against .

Recent call-ups
The follwoing players were called up within the last twelve months and remain eligible for selection.

See also
 Sweden national football team
 Sweden Olympic football team
 Sweden national under-21 football team
 Sweden national under-20 football team
 Sweden national under-17 football team
 UEFA European Under-19 Championship

References

External links
 SvFF Team 2001 page
 SvFF Team 2002 page

European national under-19 association football teams
F